The 2022–23 S.E. Melbourne Phoenix season was the 4th season of the franchise in the National Basketball League (NBL).

Roster

Standings

Ladder 

The NBL tie-breaker system as outlined in the NBL Rules and Regulations states that in the case of an identical win–loss record, the overall points percentage will determine order of seeding.

Ladder progression

Game log

Pre-season 

|-style="background:#FFBBBB;"
| 1
| 10 August
| Saint Mary's
| L 74–86 (OT)
| Kyle Adnam (12)
| Tohi Smith-Milner (8)
| Kyle Adnam (5)
| Frankston Stadium400
| 0–1

|-style="background:#FFBBBB;"
| 2
| 6 September
| @ Tasmania
| L 88–83
| Alan Williams (15)
| Grant Anticevich (8)
| Browne, Kell (4)
| Ulverstone Sports & Leisure Centre1,100
| 0–2
|-style="background:#FFBBBB;"
| 3
| 8 September
| @ Tasmania
| L 84–80
| Kyle Adnam (15)
| Dane Pineau (8)
| Gary Browne (4)
| Elphin Sports Centre1,100
| 0–3

NBL Blitz 

|-style="background:#FFBBBB;"
| 1
| 16 September
| Adelaide
| L 76–84
| Kyle Adnam (19)
| Alan Williams (7)
| Kyle Adnam (4)
| Darwin Basketball Facilitynot available 
| 0–1
|-style="background:#FFBBBB;"
| 2
| 19 September
| @ Perth
| L 87–71
| Kyle Adnam (16)
| Alan Williams (11)
| Gary Browne (8)
| Darwin Basketball Facility838
| 0–2
|-style="background:#FFBBBB;"
| 3
| 21 September
| Sydney
| L 91–79
| Kyle Adnam (24)
| Junior Madut (8)
| Kyle Adnam (5)
| Darwin Basketball Facility917
| 0–3

Regular season 

|-style="background:#BBF3BB;"
| 1
| 1 October
| Tasmania
| W 84–79
| Kyle Adnam (30)
| Anticevich, Williams (7)
| Kyle Adnam (4)
| John Cain Arena5,728
| 1–0
|-style="background:#FFBBBB;"
| 2
| 6 October
| @ Illawarra
| L 85–72
| Junior Madut (21)
| Alan Williams (11)
| Kyle Adnam (6)
| WIN Entertainment Centre2,806
| 1–1
|-style="background:#FFBBBB;"
| 3
| 8 October
| Cairns
| L 76–85
| Mitch Creek (27)
| Pineau, Williams (8)
| Alan Williams (5)
| John Cain Arena4,953
| 1–2
|-style="background:#FFBBBB;"
| 4
| 15 October
| New Zealand
| L 77–85 
| Mitch Creek (20)
| Ryan Broekhoff (8)
| Kyle Adnam (7)
| John Cain Arena4,364
| 1–3
|-style="background:#BBF3BB;"
| 5
| 20 October
| @ New Zealand
| W 77–99
| Kyle Adnam (17)
| Alan Williams (9)
| Gary Browne (9)
| The Trusts Arena2,288
| 2–3
|-style="background:#BBF3BB;"
| 6
| 22 October
| Brisbane
| W 89–88
| Mitch Creek (31)
| Alan Williams (8)
| Gary Browne (11)
| John Cain Arena5,432
| 3–3
|-style="background:#BBF3BB;"
| 7
| 28 October
| @ Perth
| W 90–91
| Mitch Creek (22)
| Alan Williams (7)
| Gary Browne (8)
| RAC Arena11,103
| 4–3
|-style="background:#BBF3BB;"
| 8
| 30 October
| Adelaide
| W 103–98 (OT)
| Trey Kell (24)
| Mitch Creek (9)
| Gary Browne (7)
| John Cain Arena7,195
| 5–3

|-style="background:#FFBBBB;"
| 9
| 6 November
| @ Melbourne
| L 110–85
| Alan Williams (30)
| Alan Williams (14)
| Gary Browne (8)
| John Cain Arena10,300
| 5–4
|-style="background:#FFBBBB;"
| 10
| 17 November
| @ Perth
| L 103–96
| Mitch Creek (32)
| Creek, Te Rangi, Williams (8)
| Gary Browne (6)
| RAC Arena9,988
| 5–5
|-style="background:#BBF3BB;"
| 11
| 19 November
| Melbourne
| W 84–69
| Mitch Creek (23)
| Alan Williams (15)
| Gary Browne (11)
| John Cain Arena10,175
| 6–5
|-style="background:#BBF3BB;"
| 12
| 27 November
| Illawarra
| W 112–78
| Mitch Creek (27)
| Alan Williams (12)
| Gary Browne (8)
| John Cain Arena5,099
| 7–5

|-style="background:#FFBBBB;"
| 13
| 1 December
| @ New Zealand
| L 110–84
| Alan Williams (29)
| Alan Williams (13)
| Kyle Adnam (5)
| Christchurch Arena3,500
| 7–6
|-style="background:#BBF3BB;"
| 14
| 3 December
| Melbourne
| W 78–72
| Alan Williams (18)
| Alan Williams (12)
| Gary Browne (7)
| John Cain Arena5,651
| 8–6
|-style="background:#BBF3BB;"
| 15
| 8 December
| Illawarra
| W 111–72
| Ryan Broekhoff (21)
| Alan Williams (11)
| Gary Browne (10)
| John Cain Arena2,918
| 9–6
|-style="background:#BBF3BB;"
| 16
| 11 December
| Adelaide
| W 102–84
| Mitch Creek (24)
| Zhou Qi (10)
| Mitch Creek (4)
| John Cain Arena4,820
| 10–6
|-style="background:#FFBBBB;"
| 17
| 15 December
| @ Melbourne
| L 92–76
| Mitch Creek (22)
| Alan Williams (12)
| Gary Browne (4)
| John Cain Arena6,228
| 10–7
|-style="background:#BBF3BB;"
| 18
| 18 December
| Sydney
| W 113–112 (2OT)
| Mitch Creek (46)
| Mitch Creek (10)
| Kyle Adnam (6)
| Gippsland Regional Indoor Stadium3,000
| 11–7
|-style="background:#BBF3BB;"
| 19
| 21 December
| @ Brisbane
| W 77–104
| Mitch Creek (29)
| Kell, Pineau (10)
| Trey Kell (6)
| Nissan Arena3,375
| 12–7
|-style="background:#FFBBBB;"
| 20
| 24 December
| @ Adelaide
| L 94–88
| Mitch Creek (24)
| Mitch Creek (5)
| Trey Kell (4)
| Adelaide Entertainment Centre6,033
| 12–8

|-style="background:#FFBBBB;"
| 21
| 1 January
| @ Tasmania
| L 99–74
| Alan Williams (21)
| Alan Williams (11)
| Creek, Foxwell (4)
| MyState Bank Arena4,269
| 12–9
|-style="background:#FFBBBB;"
| 22
| 4 January
| @ Sydney
| L 118–102
| Mitch Creek (32)
| Alan Williams (10)
| Mitch Creek (6)
| Qudos Bank Arena11,321
| 12–10
|-style="background:#FFBBBB;"
| 23
| 8 January
| @ Cairns
| L 94–85
| Mitch Creek (25)
| Alan Williams (10)
| Alan Williams (5)
| Cairns Convention Centre4,457
| 12–11
|-style="background:#FFBBBB;"
| 24
| 16 January
| Brisbane
| L 79–84
| Alan Williams (19)
| Mitch Creek (13)
| Gary Browne (6)
| State Basketball Centre3,333
| 12–12
|-style="background:#BBF3BB;"
| 25
| 18 January
| @ Tasmania
| W 75–86
| Mitch Creek (23)
| Mitch Creek (11)
| Creek, Kell (5)
| Silverdome2,286
| 13–12
|-style="background:#BBF3BB;"
| 26
| 22 January
| Perth
| W 112–91
| Alan Williams (27)
| Alan Williams (14)
| Gary Browne (8)
| State Basketball Centre3,300
| 14–12
|-style="background:#BBF3BB;"
| 27
| 25 January
| Cairns
| W 85–80
| Mitch Creek (21)
| Alan Williams (13)
| Gary Browne (5)
| State Basketball Centre3,300
| 15–12
|-style="background:#FFBBBB;"
| 28
| 29 January 
| @ Sydney
| L 111–106
| Mitch Creek (29)
| Alan Williams (12)
| Gary Browne (8)
| Qudos Bank Arena13,273
| 15–13

|- style="background:#CCCCCC;"
| –
| 4 February
| @ Brisbane
| colspan="6" | Postponed (COVID-19) (Makeup date: 21 December)

Postseason 

|-style="background:#FFBBBB;"
| 1
| 9 February 
| Perth
| L 99–106
| Mitch Creek (24)
| Alan Williams (17)
| Gary Browne (5)
| John Cain Arena5,176
| 0–1

Transactions

Re-signed

Additions

Subtractions

Awards

Club awards 
 Club MVP: Mitch Creek

See also 
 2022–23 NBL season
 South East Melbourne Phoenix

References

External links 

 Official Website

South East Melbourne Phoenix
South East Melbourne Phoenix seasons
South East Melbourne Phoenix season